Cambarus gentryi, the linear cobalt crayfish, is small burrowing species of crayfish in the family Cambaridae, notable for its blue carapace. It is endemic to Tennessee in the United States.

Physical description 
Its shell is cobalt blue in colour with orange or yellow to yellowish-green markings.

Habitat 
The linear cobalt crayfish has been found in the Cumberland and Duck river basins in Tennessee.

Conservation status 
Cambarus gentryi is listed as least concern by the IUCN.

References 

Cambaridae
Crustaceans described in 1970
Freshwater crustaceans of North America
Endemic fauna of Tennessee
Taxa named by Horton H. Hobbs Jr.